A nonagonal number (or an enneagonal number) is a figurate number that extends the concept of triangular and square numbers to the nonagon (a nine-sided polygon). However, unlike the triangular and square numbers, the patterns involved in the construction of nonagonal numbers are not rotationally symmetrical. Specifically, the  nth nonagonal number counts the number of dots in a pattern of n nested nonagons, all sharing a common corner, where the ith nonagon in the pattern has sides made of i dots spaced one unit apart from each other. The nonagonal number for n is given by the formula:

Nonagonal numbers 
The first few nonagonal numbers are:
0, 1, 9, 24, 46, 75, 111, 154, 204, 261, 325, 396, 474, 559, 651, 750, 856, 969, 1089, 1216, 1350, 1491, 1639, 1794, 1956, 2125, 2301, 2484, 2674, 2871, 3075, 3286, 3504, 3729, 3961, 4200, 4446, 4699, 4959, 5226, 5500, 5781, 6069, 6364, 6666, 6975, 7291, 7614, 7944, 8281, 8625, 8976, 9334, 9699. 

The parity of nonagonal numbers follows the pattern odd-odd-even-even.

Relationship between nonagonal and triangular numbers

Letting  denote the nth nonagonal number, and using the formula  for the nth triangular number,

Test for nonagonal numbers

If  is an integer, then  is the -th nonagonal number. If  is not an integer, then  is not nonagonal.

See also
Centered nonagonal number

References 

Figurate numbers